Maximilian Meyer (born 18 September 1995) is a German professional footballer who plays as a midfielder for Swiss club FC Luzern.

Meyer began his career in 2000, playing for local clubs in his hometown of Oberhausen. He then played within MSV Duisburg's youth system for five years, before moving to Schalke 04 in 2009. Following success at U-19 level, Meyer was promoted to the senior side, making his debut in 2013. Initially playing as an attacking midfielder, his position was made more defensive in the 2017–18 season, but a dispute with the Schalke hierarchy the following April saw him fall out of favour and subsequently run down his contract, becoming a free agent that summer.

Internationally, he represented Germany at various youth levels, playing for U15, U16, U17, U19 and U21 teams. He made his senior debut in 2014, and later captained the Olympic team at the 2016 Summer Olympics, where they finished as runners-up.

Early career
Meyer began playing football at local club FC Sardegna Oberhausen before being scouted and signed by Rot-Weiß Oberhausen at the age of seven. He spent two years in the club's academy before joining MSV Duisburg in 2004 where he remained for five years. In 2009, he transferred to Schalke 04 where he was integrated into the club's youth teams. He progressed through the ranks and was part of the U19 side which won the 2011–12 German U-19 Championship, featuring in a 2–1 win over Bayern Munich. Meyer's form at u-19 level, which saw him score 11 goals and create 11 assists in 15 appearances for the season, earned the attention of general manager Horst Heldt who signed him to his first professional contract.

Club career

Schalke 04
Following the departure of fellow midfielder Lewis Holtby to Tottenham Hotspur and the injuries of several other players, Meyer was included in Schalke's Bundesliga and UEFA Champions League squads for the 2012–13 season. He made his debut for the club on 16 February 2013, coming on as a substitute for Raffael and assisting Michel Bastos for a late goal in a 2–2 draw with Mainz 05. His Champions League debut followed on 12 March when he appeared in a match against Turkish side Galatasaray. Still aged 17, Meyer left school, the Gesamtschule Berger Feld, later that year before finishing his school-leaving examinations in order to focus on his football.

Ahead of the 2013–14 season, Meyer was issued shirt number 7 previously worn by Raúl. He started the season by scoring a brace against SSVg Velbert while playing for Schalke's reserve side, Schalke 04 II. He then featured for the first team later that month in a 4–0 league win over VfL Wolfsburg, where he came on as a 73rd minute substitute for Jefferson Farfán. On 21 August, he made his first start for the club in a Champions League play-off match against PAOK. In the return fixture, he came on as a second-half substitute and set up Julian Draxler to give Schalke the lead. He was then substituted off after just eight minutes as the club looked to hold on to the win, with German media later labelling his assist as a "€20m pass" as it helped Schalke qualify for the Champions League proper. On 25 September, Meyer scored his first goal for Schalke in a DFB-Pokal match against Darmstadt 98. He scored goals in three consecutive matches against and Augsburg and Borussia Dortmund. Following his impressive performance against Chelsea in the Champions League, he became a transfer target for the West London club, who were willing to pay Schalke €15 million. On 30 November, Meyer signed a contract extension with Schalke until 30 June 2018. On 26 January 2014, he scored in the first match after the winter break against Hamburger SV.

In the 2014–15 season, Meyer scored goals against Werder Bremen (home and away), Stuttgart and 1899 Hoffenheim. His most significant contribution was in a Champions League group stage match against Maribor, where he scored the only goal to take Schalke through to the round of 16, but they ultimately came up short against Real Madrid, losing 5–4 over two legs.

In the 2015–16 season, Meyer scored goals against Hertha Berlin, Bayern Munich, Darmstadt 98, Hamburger SV and Köln. He also scored in the final Europa League group match, the final goal in a comfortable 4–0 win over Asteras Tripoli. The following season, Meyer only scored two goals in all competitions: once in a league win over against Mainz 05, and the other in a Europa League win over PAOK.

In the 2017–18 season, under the tutelage of new manager Domenico Tedesco, Meyer played as a defensive midfielder. According to Sky Germany reporter Dirk Grosse Schlarmann, the positional change better suited his qualities with an improvement in form, and because the crowd did not expect to him to win the match, he had more time to look and think about the opening pass when Schalke went on the attack. However, in April, Meyer publicly criticised sporting director Christian Heidel and was left out of training for the rest of the season, which allowed him to run down the remainder of his contract until its expiration in June.

Crystal Palace
On 2 August 2018, Meyer signed a three-year contract with Crystal Palace. After playing regularly in his first season he began struggling for first team appearances in his second, culminating in being dropped to the U23s in December 2020 after failing to play a single minute of League football in the first half of the Eagles' 2020–21 season.
On 15 January 2021, Meyer left Crystal Palace via mutual consent.

1. FC Köln
On 25 January 2021, it was reported that Bundesliga side 1. FC Köln had signed Meyer on a free transfer until the end of the 2020–21 season.

Fenerbahçe
On 2 September 2021, Meyer signed a 2-year deal with Turkish side Fenerbahçe. He made his debut in a 1–1 Süper Lig draw against Sivasspor on 12 September 2021. On 4 November 2021, he scored his first goal for the club in a 3–0 UEFA Europa League victory against Royal Antwerp.

On 31 January 2022, Meyer was loaned to Danish side Midtjylland on a half-year deal, with an option to buy. However, after a disappointing season with only 13 appearances and zero goals, he returned to Fenerbahçe at the end of the season.

FC Luzern
Meyer moved to Swiss Super League club FC Luzern in August 2022. He signed a one-year contract.

International career

Youth
Meyer was part of the Germany U17 squad for 2012 UEFA European Under-17 Championship. He scored three goals to help Germany to reach the final, which the Germans lost in a penalty shoot-out to the Netherlands U17. Nevertheless, Meyer was top scorer and awarded best player of the tournament. Meyer won the Fritz Walter U17 Silver Medal in 2012. Meyer scored his first goal for Germany's U19 team in a friendly against the Netherlands U19.

Senior
Meyer was included in the Germany senior team's 30-man provisional squad for 2014 FIFA World Cup. On 13 May 2014, he made his senior debut against Poland. Though Meyer started the match, in the 76th minute he was substituted out for Maximilian Arnold. On 31 October 2016, Meyer scored his first goal for Germany in a 2–0 friendly win against Finland in Mönchengladbach.

Olympic team
Alongside Schalke teammate Leon Goretzka, Meyer was named in the squad for the 2016 Summer Olympics. Meyer would captain the team for the rest of the tournament after Goretzka suffered a shoulder injury. On 11 August 2016, Meyer scored a hat-trick in a 10–0 win over Fiji U23, although he also missed a penalty. In the gold medal final, played on 21 August, Meyer scored the equaliser that extended the decision to penalty shootout, which Germany lost to Brazil U23, 5–4.

Style of play
Because of his dribbling abilities and his high speed, his playing style is compared to that of Lionel Messi. When asked about his good technique, Meyer replied, "At the age of 10 I dabbled in futsal for four years besides the football club. In addition to the three workouts at the club I had one complementary futsal session per week. Saturday noon was the time for the football game and in the afternoon the futsal game took place."

Personal life
Meyer is a vegan.

Career statistics

Club

International

As of match played 11 November 2016. Germany score listed first, score column indicates score after each Meyer goal.

Honours
Germany U17
UEFA European Under-17 Championship runner-up: U17 2012

Germany U21
UEFA European Under-21 Championship: U21 2017

Germany Olympic
Summer Olympic Games Silver Medal: 2016

Individual
UEFA European Under-17 Championship Golden Player: U17 2012
UEFA European Under-17 Championship Team of the Tournament: U17 2012
 Fritz Walter Medal U17 Silver: 2012
 Fritz Walter Medal U19 Silver: 2014
UEFA European Under-21 Championship Team of the Tournament: U21 2017

References

External links

 
 
 Kicker profile

1995 births
Living people
Sportspeople from Oberhausen
People educated at the Gesamtschule Berger Feld
Footballers from North Rhine-Westphalia
German footballers
Association football midfielders
Germany international footballers
Germany under-21 international footballers
Germany youth international footballers
Bundesliga players
Premier League players
Süper Lig players
Danish Superliga players
FC Schalke 04 players
FC Schalke 04 II players
Crystal Palace F.C. players
1. FC Köln players
Fenerbahçe S.K. footballers
FC Midtjylland players
FC Luzern players
Olympic footballers of Germany
Footballers at the 2016 Summer Olympics
Olympic silver medalists for Germany
Olympic medalists in football
Medalists at the 2016 Summer Olympics
German expatriate footballers
Expatriate footballers in England
German expatriate sportspeople in England
Expatriate footballers in Turkey
German expatriate sportspeople in Turkey
Expatriate men's footballers in Denmark
German expatriate sportspeople in Denmark
Expatriate footballers in Switzerland
German expatriate sportspeople in Switzerland